Nuclear Blues is the eleventh album by the band Blood, Sweat & Tears, released in March 1980, as their first release for MCA/LAX Records. Nuclear Blues was produced by Jerry Goldstein, who had previously been known for his work with the band War.  Even though it had only been three years since they released their last album Brand New Day, the band contained a new line-up with David Clayton-Thomas being the only remaining member from that period.

This album failed to make it onto the Billboard charts. This incarnation of Blood, Sweat & Tears disbanded the following year; although various incarnations of the group have existed and toured in the years since, to date this remains their final studio album.

Nuclear Blues was reissued in Germany in 1985 on the Platinum label under the title Latin Fire.

Track listing

 "Agitato" (Bruce Cassidy) – 5:51
 "Nuclear Blues" (David Clayton-Thomas) – 4:24
 "Manic Depression (Jimi Hendrix) – 4:18
 "I'll Drown In My Own Tears" (Henry Glover) – 7:21
 "Fantasy Stage" (David Clayton-Thomas, Robert Piltch) – 5:41
 Spanish Wine Suite: – 15:11
a. "Introduction La Cantina" (Rob Piltch)
b. "(Theme) Spanish Wine" (Bruce Cassidy)
c. "Latin Fire" (Bruce Cassidy, Dave Piltch, Vern Dorge, Bobby Economou, Richard Martinez, Earl Seymour)
d. "The Challenge" (Bruce Cassidy, Dave Piltch, Vern Dorge, Bobby Economou, Richard Martinez, Earl Seymour)
e. "The Duel" (Bruce Cassidy, Dave Piltch, Vern Dorge, Bobby Economou, Richard Martinez, Earl Seymour)
f. "Amor" (Bruce Cassidy, Dave Piltch, Vern Dorge, Bobby Economou, Richard Martinez, Earl Seymour)
 "Spanish Wine (Reprise)" (Bruce Cassidy)– 1:42

Personnel

David Clayton-Thomas – vocals
Robert Piltch – guitar
David Piltch – bass
Bobby Economou – drums
Richard Martinez – organ, piano, clavinet
Bruce Cassidy – trumpet, fluegelhorn, Steiner electric trumpet
Earl Seymour – baritone and tenor sax, flute
Vern Dorge – alto and soprano Sax, flute
William Smith – background vocals on "Drown in my Own Tears"
Lonnie Jordan – background vocals on "Drown in my Own Tears"

Production

Produced by Jerry Goldstein for Far Out Productions
Recording engineer – Chris Huston
Recorded at Coconuts Recording, Miami, Florida.
Remixed at Sound City Studios, Los Angeles
Mastered by Wally Traugott

References 

Blood, Sweat & Tears albums
1980 albums
Albums produced by Jerry Goldstein (producer)
MCA Records albums